Remo Capitani (19 December 1927 – 14 February 2014), also known as Ray O'Connor and Ray O'Conner, was an Italian actor from Rome. He was probably best known for his role in the western They Call Me Trinity as Mezcal, a Mexican thief.

Capitani died on 14 February 2014 in his hometown of Rome. He was aged 86.

Selected filmography

 Five for Revenge (1966) - Gonzales henchman (uncredited)
 Kill or Be Killed (1966)
 Two Sons of Ringo (1966) - Indio henchman (uncredited)
 Up the MacGregors! (1967) - Maldonado henchman (uncredited)
 Bill il taciturno (1967) - Henchman (uncredited)
 Son of Django (1967) - Thompson Henchman (uncredited)
 Cjamango (1967) - Paco (uncredited)
 The Last Killer (1967) - Barrett henchman (uncredited)
 Death Rides a Horse (1967) - Scorta di oro (uncredited)
 The Dirty Outlaws (1967) - Man holding Rope (uncredited)
 Bandidos (1967) - Saloon Patron (uncredited)
 Buckaroo: The Winchester Does Not Forgive (1967) - Sheriff Helper (uncredited)
 God Forgives... I Don't! (1967) - Publican in saloon
 Face to Face (1967) - Taylor Henchman (uncredited)
 Don't Wait, Django... Shoot! (1967) - Alvarez henchman (uncredited)
 Colt in the Hand of the Devil (1967) - Hitman (uncredited)
 And Then a Time for Killing (1968) - Man Carrying Sign at Funeral
 Sapevano solo uccidere (1968) - Stagecoach driver
 Today We Kill... Tomorrow We Die! (1968) - Publican (uncredited)
 May God Forgive You... But I Won't (1968) - Sleepy Smart Guard (uncredited)
 Sartana the Gravedigger (1968) - Lieutnant Miguel (uncredited)
 Revenge for Revenge (1968) - Sheriff
 Ace High (1968) - Cangaceiro
 Django the Bastard (1969) - Murdok Henchman Playing with Dynamite (uncredited)
 Chuck Moll (1970) - Jack - Asylum Warden (uncredited)
 Rough Justice (1970) - Sheriff Jack
 I vendicatori dell'Ave Maria (1970) - Pedro Serrano
 They Call Me Trinity (1970) - Mezcal
 Bastard, Go and Kill (1971) - Sgt. Hernandez
 W Django! (1971)
 Ben and Charlie (1972) - Charro
 Panhandle 38 (1972) - El Tornado
 Spirito Santo e le 5 magnifiche canaglie (1972) - Diego d'Asburgo
 Bada alla tua pelle, Spirito Santo! (1972) - Diego di Asburgo
 Two Sons of Trinity (1972) - Requiem (uncredited)
 Così sia (1972) - 2nd Sheriff (uncredited)
 Novelle galeotte d'amore (1972)
 Canterbury proibito (1972) - Friar (segment "Viola")
 Finalmente... le mille e una notte (1972)
 The Grand Duel (1972) - Bounty Hunter 
 Fra' Tazio da Velletri (1973) - Fra' Tazio da Velletri
 Kid il monello del west (1973)
 Abbasso tutti, viva noi (1974) - Mar. Finocchioni - Father of Aristide 
 Carambola's Philosophy: In the Right Pocket (1975) - Gonzales
 Porno-Erotic Western (1979) - (final film role)

References

Other websites

 

1927 births
2014 deaths
Male actors from Rome
Italian male film actors
Male Spaghetti Western actors
20th-century Italian male actors